Ormiston Forge Academy (formerly Heathfield Foundation Technology College and Heathfield High School) is a secondary school and sixth form with academy status located in the Old Hill area of Cradley Heath, West Midlands, England.

Heathfield High School was built in the 1970s when two local schools Cradley Heath Secondary School, in the Lomey Town area of Cradley Heath, and Macefield Secondary School, in Old Hill, merged. The name of the school was coined from the names of the two schools.

The new building programme of 2007 was completed, with a new hair and beauty salon, seminar rooms, catering rooms and a new sixth form study centre.

As of 2011, the school became an academy sponsored by the Ormiston Academies Trust. The school was then renamed Ormiston Forge Academy.

Today, the school serves pupils living in the Cradley Heath, Old Hill and Rowley Regis areas of Sandwell.

The school has a mountain centre located in Dinas Mawddwy, Gwynedd, North Wales. The building, previously an old school, was converted into accommodation for students when taking part in environmental studies, or some other rural activity. The original mountain centre was located in Llanbrynmair, Powys, Mid-Wales. This was a converted church building.

Notable former pupils

Tyler Bate, professional wrestler

References

External links
Ormiston Forge Academy official website

Secondary schools in Sandwell
Academies in Sandwell
Ormiston Academies